Vision Quest (released in the United Kingdom and Australia as Crazy for You) is a 1985 American coming-of-age romantic drama film starring Matthew Modine, Linda Fiorentino, Michael Schoeffling and Ronny Cox. It is based on Terry Davis's 1979 novel of the same name. Modine plays a Spokane high school wrestler who falls in love with an older woman, an aspiring artist from New Jersey on her way to San Francisco.

The film includes an appearance by Madonna, her first in a major motion picture, playing a singer at a local bar, where she performs the songs "Crazy for You" and "Gambler".  In some countries, the title of the film was changed to capitalize on Madonna's emerging fame and the popularity of the song "Crazy for You".

Plot 

Louden Swain is a wrestler at Thompson High School who has just turned 18 years old. He has decided that he needs to do something truly meaningful in his life. He embarks on a mission or, in a Native American term, a vision quest, to drop two weight classes to challenge the area's toughest opponent, Brian Shute, a menacing three-time state champion from nearby rival Hoover High School, who has never been defeated in his high school career.

Meanwhile, his father has taken on a boarder named Carla from Trenton, New Jersey, passing through on her way to San Francisco. Louden falls in love with her and begins to lose sight of his goals as a wrestler. Worse, his drastic weight loss culminates in an unhealthy situation where he gets frequent nosebleeds which, Louden assumes, is due to a lack of iron in his diet (and results in him having to forfeit a match he was winning). The two finally admit their love for each other, but Carla realizes she is distracting him from his goals.

Carla decides to move out and continue on to San Francisco, but not before seeing Louden's big match in which he pins Shute in the final seconds with a hip throw after suffering a nose bleed. As Louden celebrates his victory, he monologues to the audience, "...I guess that's why we got to love those people who deserve it like there's no tomorrow. 'Cause when you get right down to it—there isn't."

Cast
 Matthew Modine as Louden Swain
 Linda Fiorentino as Carla
 Michael Schoeffling as Kenny "Kuch" Kuchera
 Ronny Cox as Larry Swain
 Frank Jasper as Brian Shute
 Harold Sylvester as Gene Tanneran
 Daphne Zuniga as Margie Epstein
 Charles Hallahan as Coach Ratta
 J.C. Quinn as Elmo
 R.H. Thomson as Kevin
 Gary Kasper as Otto Lafte
 Raphael Sbarge as Kenny Schmoozler
 Forest Whitaker as Jean-Pierre "Balldozer" Baldosier
 Roberts Blossom as Harry Swain
 James Gammon as Mr. Kuchera
 Madonna as Club Singer
 Ken Pelo as Coach Charlie Swann
 Jana Marie Hupp as Sally
 Andrew Shue as Bar Patron
 Pat Brown as Wrestler (Extra)

Production
Production took place in Spokane, Washington, in the fall of 1983. The film was shot at Rogers High School in northeast Spokane, referred to as "Thompson High School" in the film. Interior cafeteria scenes were filmed at Ferris High School on Spokane's South Hill. Some of the locker room scenes were filmed in the boys' locker room of Shadle Park High School in northwest Spokane. Madonna's scene was filmed at the Big Foot Tavern on North Division Street in Spokane. Other scenes were shot at The Onion Restaurant downtown and the North Central High School gym. The scene where Louden's big match happens was shot in the gym of Spokane Falls Community College. Erik Abbey consulted on the wrestling scenes to verify their authenticity.

Reception
The film had moderate success in theaters in the U.S. in 1985, earning a gross of $13 million. It has received a rating of 60% at Rotten Tomatoes from 15 reviews, and has become a cult classic.

Roger Ebert of The Chicago Sun-Times gave the film 3.5 stars out of a possible 4, saying while the core storyline was a formulaic sports drama "it is nevertheless a movie with some nice surprises, mostly because it takes the time to create some interesting characters", with standout performances from Modine, Cox and Fiorentino.

Soundtrack

The soundtrack to the motion picture was released by Geffen Records on February 12, 1985; the movie was renamed Crazy for You in some countries such as Australia and the UK due to the new popularity of pop singer Madonna and her song "Crazy for You".

The soundtrack does not include "No More Words" by Berlin, nor tracks from REO Speedwagon, and Quarterflash, which had appeared in the film. The background instrumental music by Tangerine Dream is not included, but was later released on the fan project Tangerine Tree 73: Soundtrax.

Track listing

Charts

Certifications

Potential remake
In 2009, interest in a remake was generated after Taylor Lautner of Twilight fame expressed interest. E! News claimed a script existed which Lautner reportedly approved.

References

External links

 
 
 

1985 films
1980s coming-of-age drama films
1985 romantic drama films
1980s sports drama films
American coming-of-age drama films
American romantic drama films
Coming-of-age romance films
1980s English-language films
Films based on American novels
Films based on young adult literature
Films directed by Harold Becker
Films produced by Jon Peters
Films produced by Peter Guber
Films scored by Tangerine Dream
Films set in Washington (state)
Films shot in Washington (state)
Sport wrestling films
American sports drama films
1980s American films
1980s high school films